Mike Jones (born 1954) is the former athletic director and men's basketball head coach for Mississippi College. The floor at A. E. Wood Coliseum is Mike Jones Court. He is a member of the school's athletics hall of fame and Mississippi's Sports hall of fame.

References

1954 births
Living people
American men's basketball coaches
Mississippi College alumni
Mississippi College Choctaws athletic directors
Mississippi College Choctaws men's basketball coaches
Junior college men's basketball coaches in the United States
Southern Miss Golden Eagles basketball coaches